Moonika Aava (born 19 June 1979) is an Estonian javelin thrower. Her personal best is 61.42 metres achieved on 2 August 2004, in her home country's capital Tallinn. This is the former Estonian record.

She practices athletics with the Pärnu SK Altius club under the supervision of Toomas Merila, her trainer. She won the national championships in 1995, 1996, 2000, 2001 and 2002.

Achievements

References 

 

1979 births
Living people
Sportspeople from Rakvere
Estonian female javelin throwers
Athletes (track and field) at the 2004 Summer Olympics
Athletes (track and field) at the 2008 Summer Olympics
Olympic athletes of Estonia
World Athletics Championships athletes for Estonia
20th-century Estonian women
21st-century Estonian women